Sayani (also Romanized as Sāyānī; also known as Sīānī) is a village in Pir Sohrab Rural District, in the Central District of Chabahar County, Sistan and Baluchestan Province, Iran. At the 2006 census, its population was 367, in 65 families.

References 

Populated places in Chabahar County